Reachin' (A New Refutation of Time and Space) is the debut album by alternative hip hop group Digable Planets released on February 9, 1993, by Pendulum/Elektra Records. The album has been certified Gold in the US by the RIAA.

Production 
The album was produced by Digable Planets' Ishmael Butler ("Butterfly") and features raps from Butler, Irving and Viera. The production leans heavily on jazz samples, Butler explaining that "it was all about resources, really...I just went and got the records that I had around me. And a lot of those were my dad's shit, which was lots of jazz. The whole concept of 'We're a jazz group' didn't go down like that. Except that DJ Premier was a big influence, and he sampled a lot of jazz."

Lyrically, the tone of the album is less overtly political than its successor Blowout Comb, but still touches on issues such as abortion rights ("La Femme Fetal") and the drug abuses of jazz musicians ("Last of the Spiddyocks"). The album title derives from A New Refutation of Time, an essay by Argentinian author Jorge Luis Borges, as well as the tendency of earlier jazz musicians in naming their albums (Moanin', Cookin', etc). Butler and Irving give a track-by-track account of the album and its production in Brian Coleman's book Check the Technique.

Reception 

The single "Rebirth of Slick (Cool Like Dat)" became a hit in 1993, breaking into the Top 15 on the Billboard Hot 100 chart and winning Grammy Award for Best Rap Performance by a Duo or Group in 1994. In 1998, Reachin' was listed in The Source's 100 Best Rap Albums. In 2008, "Rebirth of Slick (Cool Like Dat)" was ranked number 62 on VH1's 100 Greatest Songs of Hip Hop. The song "Rebirth of Slick (Cool Like Dat)" was used for a Tide commercial in 2009.

Track listing

Charts

Weekly charts

Year-end charts

References

1993 debut albums
Digable Planets albums
Elektra Records albums
Pendulum Records albums